Anagennisi Arta Football Club is a Greek football club, based in Arta, in the North-West part of Greece. The emblem of the team depicts the historical bridge of Arta. The club was established in 1960 from the union between local Arta clubs Panamvrakikos (1928), Aetos (1948) and Olympiacos (1957). The colours of the club are Black-White. The fans were never under a strong organisation. They used to form various groups like "black cannibals" or "black knights" but nothing official. There is no official fan club. The club has nurtured many great football players in the past such as Antonis Nikopolidis, Giorgos Vaitsis, Sotiris Balafas, Michalis Kapsis, Vaggelis Kaounos and others. Arta fans have a brotherhood with Palermo fans. For the 2015/2016 season, Anagennisi play in the first league of Arta Prefecture

Honours

Domestic Titles and Honours
 Third Division: 3
 1968–69, 1975–76, 1977–78
 Fourth Division: 2
 1982–83, 1990–91
 Championship Arta: 4
 1999–2000, 2001–02, 2013–2014, 2018–19
 Cup Arta: 7
 1993–94, 1998–99, 2001–02, 2002–03, 2003–04, 2009–10, 2012–13
 Championship Epirus: 3
 1965–66, 1968–69, 1975–76
 Cup Epirus: 2
 1975–76, 1977–78

Players

Current squad

See also

Handball
In addition to football, the Anagennisi club is well known for its successful women's handball team. It was founded in 1987. Since then it has won:
12 national championships (1995, 1996, 1997, 1998, 1999, 2000, 2001, 2002, 2003, 2004, 2005, 2006)
10 national cups (1998, 1999, 2000, 2001, 2002, 2003, 2004, 2005, 2006, 2008)
The men's handball team isn't so successful. It has played in the second league for years.

Volleyball

The volleyball team was founded in 1980. It never managed to play the lead at a high level. However, it has won several titles in lower divisions for both men and women.

External links
 Football team's official website 
 Fans' official website 
 Women's handball 

 
Football clubs in Epirus
Association football clubs established in 1960
1960 establishments in Greece
Gamma Ethniki clubs